The Rock Hill Public Library is a public library in Rock Hill, Missouri, a suburb of St. Louis.  Established in 1943, the library holds more than 53,000 items.

It is a member of the Municipal Library Consortium, which is made up of nine independent libraries in St. Louis County.

References

External links
 
 Libraries.org | https://librarytechnology.org/library/20316

Public libraries in Missouri
Libraries in Greater St. Louis
Municipal Library Consortium of St. Louis County
1943 establishments in Missouri
Buildings and structures in St. Louis County, Missouri